San Miguel Brewery Hong Kong Ltd. (SMBHK) is a brewery based in Hong Kong and is a majority-owned subsidiary of San Miguel Brewing International Ltd., a wholly owned subsidiary of San Miguel Brewery, Inc. The company has two subsidiaries located in the Guangdong province of the People’s Republic of China. An affiliate company, San Miguel Baoding Brewery Company Limited, is based in Baoding, China.

History
San Miguel Beer (San Miguel Pale Pilsen) was first produced in 1890 by La Fabrica de Cerveza de San Miguel (San Miguel Brewery, now known as San Miguel Corporation) in Manila, Philippines. The brewery received the Royal Grant from the King of Spain to brew beer in the Philippines, which was then a Spanish colony.

In 1914, San Miguel Brewery began exporting San Miguel Beer to Hong Kong.  The San Miguel brand name is known in Chinese as 生力 and the San Miguel Beer product name is known as 生力啤酒.

In 1948, San Miguel acquired Hong Kong Brewers and Distillers Ltd., which was established by Jehangir Hormusjee Ruttonjee in Sham Tseng in 1930, and renamed The Hong Kong Breweries Ltd.. In 1963, the company name was changed to San Miguel Brewery Ltd. and was listed in the Hong Kong Stock Exchange .

On March 25, 1994, the company adopted its present name, San Miguel Brewery Hong Kong Ltd. (SMBHK). In 1996, the Sham Tseng facility was closed down and its new brewery in Yuen Long was inaugurated.

Products

 San Miguel Pale Pilsen - domestic
 San Miguel Pale Pilsen - imported from the Philippines
 San Miguel Premium All-Malt
 San Mig Light
 San Miguel Cerveza Negra
 Blue Ice
 Brück 
 Knight
 Polar Ice
 Valor

Other brands:
 James Boag's
 Samuel Adams
 Kirin Ichiban
 Kirin Lager
 Kirin Stout

Distributor of Anheuser-Busch InBev brands (1999 until December 31, 2014):
 Beck's
 Boddingtons
 Hoegaarden
 Leffe
 Löwenbräu
 Stella Artois

Distributor of Anheuser-Busch InBev brands (2011 until November 17, 2014):
 Budweiser
 Harbin

Southern China:
 San Miguel Pale Pilsen
 San Mig Light
 San Miguel Draught
 Red Horse Beer
 Valor
 Valor Light
 Guang's YES Beer
 Guang's Pineapple Beer
 Double Happiness Beer
 Dragon Beer
 Dragon Gold Beer
 Dragon Platinum Beer

Subsidiaries
 San Miguel (Guangdong) Brewery Company Ltd.
 Guangzhou San Miguel Brewery Company Ltd.

See also
San Miguel Brewery
San Miguel Corporation
List of companies of Hong Kong

Manufacturing in Hong Kong

References

External links

 SMBHK investor website
 SMBHK consumer website

Hong Kong brands
Companies listed on the Hong Kong Stock Exchange
Beer in Hong Kong
Food and drink companies established in 1948
San Miguel Corporation subsidiaries
Former companies in the Hang Seng Index